Dallas City is a city in Hancock and Henderson counties in the U.S. state of Illinois. The population in 2020 stands at an estimate of 805, a decline from the 2010 census of 945, which was a decline from 1,055 in 2000.

The Hancock County portion of Dallas City is part of the Fort Madison–Keokuk, IA–IL–MO Micropolitan Statistical Area, and the Henderson County portion of Dallas City is part of the Burlington, IA–IL Micropolitan Statistical Area.

History
Within historical records, a man with the name Israel Atherton purchased the land around present-day Dallas City in 1836. He built a log cabin but he didn't seem to stay very long. He sold the land to John Finch, who built a village, which today is still recognized as, Dallas City. It was laid out in 1848, and named in honor of George Mifflin Dallas, 11th Vice President of the United States of America, from 1845 to 1849. A post office has been in operation at Dallas City since 1850.

Abraham Lincoln Monument 
On October 23, 1858, Abraham Lincoln stopped in Dallas City, Illinois to deliver a speech. There were many people who were the cause of Lincoln visiting Dallas City in the act of persuasion; George M. Ames, H.F. Black, and Ben Mendenhall. A monument to represent Lincoln's visit sits on the Mississippi River on the Riverfront Park at the end of Oak St. According to the Dallas City Review newspaper, Democrats have tried several times to tear down the platform whilst giving his speech, but the many republican forces did not allow that to happen.

However, there were supposed to be two stones with bronze plaques, one for Lincoln's visit, the other for President James Polk along with his Vice-President, George M Dallas. There is no information given as to why that other plaque was not included on the stone, but it is assumed Lincoln's was more impactful.

The day before (October 22, 1858), Lincoln had spoken at the second courthouse made in Hancock County, the county Dallas City is a part of, to residents as he and Stephen A. Douglas were running against one another for the US Senate.

Geography
Dallas City is located at  (40.636565, -91.165256).

Demographics

As of the census of 2000, there were 1,055 people, 466 households, and 301 families residing in the city. The racial makeup of the city was 99.72% White, 0.09% Native American, and 0.19% from two or more races. Hispanic or Latino of any race were 0.57% of the population.

There were 466 households, out of which 23.2% had children under the age of 18 living with them, 55.4% were married couples living together, 7.9% had a female householder with no husband present, and 35.2% were non-families. 30.7% of all households were made up of individuals, and 15.7% had someone living alone who was 65 years of age or older.  The average household size was 2.25 and the average family size was 2.79.

In the city, the population was spread out, with 20.6% under the age of 18, 6.4% from 18 to 24, 22.7% from 25 to 44, 28.9% from 45 to 64, and 21.4% who were 65 years of age or older.  The median age was 45 years. For every 100 females, there were 85.1 males.  For every 100 females age 18 and over, there were 83.0 males.

The median income for a household in the city was $31,731, and the median income for a family was $41,316. Males had a median income of $37,279 versus $18,571 for females. The per capita income for the city was $16,188.  About 9.5% of families and 13.4% of the population were below the poverty line, including 18.6% of those under age 18 and 10.1% of those age 65 or over.

Education

Dallas Elementary School District 327 operates the public elementary school; it formerly was known as Dallas City Community School District #336.Although there is no exact date other than the early 1900s, the Dallas City High School was opened. The design of the building imitates the making of a castle. The school's nickname and mascot were the "Bulldogs", and their colors were red and black. The school's athletic teams did not fall far from greatness. Within the time it was open, the boy's teams won a total of 12 regional championships, 6 of which were earned in the 1940s.

In 2001 Dallas City High School closed and was converted into the Great River Community Center; the city government installed additional parking in front of the former high school. The Dallas City area was reassigned to Nauvoo-Colusa Community Unit School District 325 for high school, so that year 70 students and all but two of the Dallas City High teachers moved to Nauvoo-Colusa High School. In 2008 the Nauvoo-Colusa district closed its high school and redirected students to Warsaw Community Unit School District 316's Warsaw High School. Upon promoting from the eighth grade, students attend high school at Illini West in Carthage, Illinois.

References

External links

 

Cities in Illinois
Illinois populated places on the Mississippi River
Cities in Hancock County, Illinois
Cities in Henderson County, Illinois
Burlington, Iowa micropolitan area
1848 establishments in Illinois